Adam Mirković (born November 13, 1991) is a Serbian professional basketball player for BC Timișoara.

References

External links
 Eurobasket Profile
 RealGM Profile
 BalkanLeague Profile
 DraftExpress Profile

1991 births
Living people
Basketball players from Belgrade
Basketball League of Serbia players
KK Jagodina players
KK Kakanj players
KK Radnički KG 06 players
KK Tamiš players
Forwards (basketball)
Serbian expatriate basketball people in Bosnia and Herzegovina
Serbian expatriate basketball people in France
Serbian expatriate basketball people in North Macedonia
Serbian expatriate basketball people in Montenegro
Serbian expatriate basketball people in Romania
Serbian expatriate basketball people in Switzerland
Serbian men's basketball players